Ch'uñu Pata (Aymara and Quechua ch'uñu a dried, frozem potato, pata stone bench, step, bank of a river, "ch'uñu step (or bank)", also spelled Chuño Pata) is a mountain in the Bolivian Andes which reaches a height of approximately . It is located in the Cochabamba Department, Ayopaya Province, Cocapata Municipality. Ch'uñu Pata lies east of the Sinturani Lake.

References 

Mountains of Cochabamba Department